Philosophy is the study of general and fundamental problems concerning matters such as existence, knowledge, values, reason, mind, and language. It is distinguished from other ways of addressing fundamental questions (such as mysticism, myth, or religion) by being critical and generally systematic and by its reliance on rational argument. It involves logical analysis of language and clarification of the meaning of words and concepts.

The word "philosophy" comes from the Greek philosophia (φιλοσοφία), which literally means "love of wisdom".

Branches of philosophy 
The branches of philosophy and their sub-branches that are used in contemporary philosophy are as follows.

Aesthetics
Aesthetics is study of the nature of beauty, art, and taste, and the creation of personal kinds of truth.
 Applied aesthetics – application of the philosophy of aesthetics to art and culture.

Epistemology
Epistemology is the branch of philosophy that studies the source, nature and validity of knowledge. 

 Social epistemology – inquiry into the social aspects of knowledge. 
 Formal epistemology – the application of formal models to study knowledge. 
 Metaepistemology – studying the foundations of epistemology itself.

Ethics
Ethics – study of value and morality.
 Applied ethics – philosophical examination, from a moral standpoint, of particular issues in private and public life that are matters of moral judgment. It is thus the attempts to use philosophical methods to identify the morally correct course of action in various fields of human life.
Bioethics – analysis of controversial ethical issues emerging from advances in medicine.
Environmental ethics – studies ethical issues concerning the non-human world. It exerts influence on a large range of disciplines including environmental law, environmental sociology, ecotheology, ecological economics, ecology and environmental geography.
Medical ethics – studies ethical issues concerning medicine and medical research
Professional ethics – ethics to improve professionalism
 Descriptive ethics – study of people's beliefs about morality
 Discourse ethics – discovery of ethical principles through the study of language
 Formal ethics – discovery of ethical principles through the application of logic
 Normative ethics – study of ethical theories that prescribe how people ought to act
 Metaethics – branch of ethics that seeks to understand the nature of ethical properties, statements, attitudes, and judgments

Logic
Logic – the systematic study of the form of valid inference and reasoning.

 Classical logic
 Propositional logic
 First-order logic
 Second-order logic
 Higher-order logic
 Non-classical logic
 Description logic
 Digital logic
 Fuzzy logic
 Intuitionistic logic
 Many-valued logic
Modal logic
 Alethic logic
 Deontic logic
 Doxastic logic
 Epistemic logic
 Temporal logic
 Paraconsistent logic
 Substructural logic

Metaphysics
Metaphysics – concerned with explaining the fundamental nature of being and the world that encompasses it. 

 Cosmology – the study of the nature and origins of the universe.

Ontology – philosophical study of the nature of being, becoming, existence, or reality, as well as the basic categories of being and their relations.
 Meta-ontology – study of the ontological foundations of ontology itself.
Philosophy of space and time – branch of philosophy concerned with the issues surrounding the ontology, epistemology, and character of space and time.

Philosophy of mind 
Philosophy of mind – studies the nature of the mind, mental properties, consciousness, and their relationship to the physical body, particularly the brain.

 Philosophy of action – theories about the processes causing willful human bodily movements of a more or less complex kind. This area of thought has attracted the strong interest of philosophers ever since Aristotle's Nicomachean Ethics (Third Book).
 Philosophy of self – The philosophy of self is the study of the many conditions of identity that make one subject of experience distinct from other experiences

Philosophy of science 
Philosophy of science – the branch of philosophy dealing with the epistemology, methodology and foundations of science

 Philosophy of anthropology
 Philosophy of archaeology
 Philosophy of biology
 Philosophy of chemistry
 Philosophy of computer science
 Philosophy of artificial intelligence
 Philosophy of geography
 Philosophy of medicine
 Philosophy of physics
 Interpretations of quantum mechanics
 Philosophy of social science
 Philosophy of economics
 Philosophy of psychology

Other
 Meta-philosophy
 Philosophy of education
 Philosophy of history
 Philosophy of language
 Philosophy of law
 Philosophy of mathematics
 Philosophy of religion
 Political philosophy
 Environmental philosophy

Philosophic traditions by region 
Regional variations of philosophy.

Africana philosophy 

 Akan philosophy
 Ethiopian philosophy
 Ubuntu philosophy

Eastern philosophy 

 Chinese philosophy
 Indian philosophy
 Indonesian philosophy
 Japanese philosophy
 Korean philosophy
 Vietnamese philosophy

Middle Eastern Philosophy 

 Iranian philosophy
 Pakistani philosophy
 Turkish philosophy

Indigenous American philosophy 

Aztec philosophy

Western philosophy 

 American philosophy
 Australian philosophy
 British philosophy
 Canadian philosophy
 Czech philosophy
 Danish philosophy
 Dutch philosophy
 French philosophy
 Greek philosophy
 German philosophy
 Italian philosophy
 Maltese philosophy
 Polish philosophy
 Romanian philosophy
 Russian philosophy
 Scottish philosophy
 Slovene philosophy
 Spanish philosophy
 Yugoslav philosophy

History of philosophy
The history of philosophy in specific contexts of time and space.

Timeline of philosophy 

 11th century in philosophy
 12th century in philosophy
 13th century in philosophy
 14th century in philosophy
 15th century in philosophy
 16th century in philosophy
 17th century in philosophy
 18th century in philosophy
 19th-century philosophy
 20th-century philosophy

Ancient and classical philosophy
Philosophies during ancient history.

Ancient Greek and Roman philosophy 

Pre-Socratic philosophy
Milesian school - Thales, Anaximander, Anaximenes
Xenophanes
Pythagoreanism
Heraclitus
Eleatics - Parmenides, Zeno, and Melissus
Pluralists - Empedocles and Anaxagoras
Atomists - Leucippus, Democritus
Sophists
Classical Greek philosophy
Socratic schools
Megarian school
Eretrian school
Cynicism
Cyrenaics
Platonism
Peripatetic school
Hellenistic philosophy
Academic skepticism
Middle Academy
New Academy
Epicureanism
Pyrrhonism
Stoicism
Ancient Roman philosophy
Middle Platonism
Neopythagoreanism
Neoplatonism

Classical Chinese philosophy 

 Hundred Schools of Thought
 Confucianism
 Legalism
 Taoism
 Mohism
 School of Naturalists
 School of Names
 School of Diplomacy
 Agriculturalism
 Syncretism
 Yangism

Classical Indian philosophy 

 Orthodox schools
 Samkhya
 Yoga
 Nyaya
 Vaisheshika
 Mīmāṃsā
 Vedanta
 Heterodox schools
 Ajñana
 Jain philosophy
 Buddhist philosophy
 Ājīvika
 Charvaka

Medieval and post-classical philosophy 

Philosophies during post-classical history.

Christian philosophy 

Neoplatonism Christian
Scholasticism
Thomism

Islamic philosophy 

Avicennism
Averroism
Illuminationism

Jewish philosophy 

Judeo-Islamic philosophies

Post-classical Chinese philosophy 
Neo-Confucianism
Xuanxue
Zen

Modern and contemporary philosophy 
Philosophies during the modern era.

Renaissance philosophy 

Renaissance humanism
Renaissance Jewish philosophy
Machiavellianism
Neostoicism
Ramism
School of Salamanca

Early modern philosophy 

Empiricism
Rationalism
Idealism

Contemporary philosophy 

Analytic philosophy
Continental philosophy
Existentialism
Phenomenology
Contemporary Asian philosophy
Buddhist modernism
New Confucianism
Maoism
Kyoto School
Neo-Vedanta
Contemporary Islamic philosophy
Transcendent theosophy
Pragmatism
Traditionalist School

Philosophical schools of thought 
Philosophical schools of thought not tied to particular historic contexts.

Aesthetical movements 

 Symbolism
 Romanticism
 Historicism
 Classicism
 Modernism
 Postmodernism
 Psychoanalytic theory

Epistemological stances 

 Coherentism
 Constructivist epistemology
 Contextualism
 Embodied cognition
 Empiricism
 Fallibilism
 Foundationalism
 Holism
 Infinitism
 Innatism
 Internalism and externalism
 Logical positivism
 Naïve realism
 Naturalized epistemology
 Objectivist epistemology
 Phenomenalism
 Positivism
 Reductionism
 Reliabilism
 Representative realism
 Rationalism
 Situated cognition
 Skepticism
 Theory of Forms
 Transcendental idealism
 Uniformitarianism

Ethical theories 
 Consequentialism
 Deontology
 Virtue ethics
 Moral realism
 Moral relativism
 Error theory
 Non-cognitivism
 Ethical egoism
 Cultural relativism
 Evolutionary ethics
 Evolution of morality
 Face-to-face

Logical systems 
 Classical logic
 Intermediate logic
 Intuitionistic logic
 Minimal logic
 Relevant logic
 Affine logic
 Linear logic
 Ordered logic
 Dialetheism

Metaphysical stances 

 Absurdism
 Anti-realism
 Cartesian dualism
 Free will
 Materialism
 Meaning of life
 Idealism
 Existentialism
 Essentialism
 Libertarianism
 Determinism
 Compatibilism
 Naturalism
 Monism
 Platonic idealism
 Hindu idealism
 Phenomenalism
 Nihilism
 Realism
 Physicalism
 MOQ
 Relativism
 Scientific realism
 Solipsism
 Subjectivism
 Substance theory
 Type theory
Emergentism
Emanationism

Political philosophies 
 Anarchism
 Authoritarianism
 Conservatism
 Liberalism
 Libertarianism
 Social democracy
 Socialism
 Communism

Philosophy of language theories and stances 

 Causal theory of reference
 Contrast theory of meaning
 Contrastivism
 Conventionalism
 Cratylism
 Deconstruction
 Descriptivist theory of names
 Direct reference theory
 Dramatism
 Expressivism
 Linguistic determinism
 Logical atomism
 Mediated reference theory
 Nominalism
 Non-cognitivism
 Phallogocentrism
 Quietism
 Relevance theory
 Semantic externalism
 Semantic holism
 Structuralism
 Supposition theory
 Symbiosism
 Theological noncognitivism
 Theory of descriptions
 Verification theory

Philosophy of mind theories and stances 

 Behaviourism
 Biological naturalism
 Consciousness
 Disjunctivism
 Dualism
 Eliminative materialism
 Emergent materialism
 Enactivism
 Epiphenomenalism
 Functionalism
 Identity theory
 Idealism
 Interactionism
 Materialism
 Monism
 Neutral monism
 Panpsychism
 Phenomenalism
 Phenomenology
 Physicalism
 Property dualism
 Representational theory of mind
 Sense datum theory
 Solipsism
 Substance dualism
 Qualia theory

Philosophy of religion stances 

 Theories of religion
 Acosmism
 Agnosticism
 Animism
 Antireligion
 Atheism
 Dharmism
 Deism
 Divine command theory
 Dualistic cosmology
 Esotericism
 Exclusivism
 Existentialism
 Christian
 Agnostic
 Atheist
 Feminist theology
 Fideism
 Fundamentalism
 Gnosticism
 Henotheism
 Humanism
 Religious
 Secular
 Christian
 Inclusivism
 Monism
 Monotheism
 Mysticism
 Naturalism
 Metaphysical
 Religious
 Humanistic
 New Age
 Nondualism
 Nontheism
 Pandeism
 Pantheism
 Perennialism
 Polytheism
 Process theology
 Spiritualism
 Shamanism
 Taoic
 Theism
 Transcendentalism

Philosophy of science theories and stances 

 Confirmation holism
 Coherentism
 Contextualism
 Conventionalism
 Deductive-nomological model
 Determinism
 Empiricism
 Fallibilism
 Foundationalism
 Hypothetico-deductive model
 Infinitism
 Instrumentalism
 Positivism
 Pragmatism
 Rationalism
 Received view of theories
 Reductionism
 Semantic view of theories
 Scientific realism
 Scientism
 Scientific anti-realism
 Skepticism
 Uniformitarianism
 Vitalism

Philosophical literature 

 Blackwell Companion to Philosophy
 A History of Western Philosophy by Bertrand Russell
 A History of Philosophy by Frederick Copleston

Reference works 

 Encyclopedia of Philosophy – one of the major English encyclopedias of philosophy. The second edition, edited by Donald M. Borchert, was published in ten volumes in 2006 by Thomson Gale. Volumes 1–9 contain alphabetically ordered articles.
 Internet Encyclopedia of Philosophy – a free online encyclopedia on philosophical topics and philosophers founded by James Fieser in 1995. The current general editors are James Fieser (Professor of Philosophy at the University of Tennessee at Martin) and Bradley Dowden (Professor of Philosophy at California State University, Sacramento). The staff also includes numerous area editors as well as volunteers.
 Routledge Encyclopedia of Philosophy – encyclopedia of philosophy edited by Edward Craig that was first published by Routledge in 1998. Originally published in both 10 volumes of print and as a CD-ROM, in 2002 it was made available online on a subscription basis. The online version is regularly updated with new articles and revisions to existing articles. It has 1,300 contributors providing over 2,000 scholarly articles.
 Stanford Encyclopedia of Philosophy – combines an online encyclopedia of philosophy with peer reviewed publication of original papers in philosophy, freely-accessible to internet users. Each entry is written and maintained by an expert in the field, including professors from many academic institutions worldwide.

Philosophers

Lists of philosophers
 Timeline of Western philosophers
 Timeline of Eastern philosophers

See also

 Outline of philosophy of artificial intelligence
 List of important publications in philosophy
 List of philosophy awards
 Index of philosophy
 Index of philosophy of science articles
 Unsolved problems in philosophy

References

External links

 Taxonomy of Philosophy – topic outline developed by David Chalmers as the category structure for the table of contents of the PhilPapers academic directory.
 PhilPapers – comprehensive directory of online philosophical articles and books.
 Dictionary of Philosophical Terms and Names
 Guide to Philosophy on the Internet
 The Internet Encyclopedia of Philosophy
 The Ism Book
 Introducing Philosophy Series. By Paul Newall (for beginners)
 Philosophical positions (philosophy, movement, school, theory, etc.)
 The Problems of Philosophy, by Bertrand Russell (links provided to full text)
 Stanford Encyclopedia of Philosophy

Philosophy
Philosophy